The Thyolo district of Malawi is one of the districts in Malawi. The capital is Thyolo. The district covers an area of 1,715 km.² and has a population of 458,976. It is also has crossroads leading to Makwasa, Molere, Konzalendo, Thekerani into Muona and eventually Nsanje leading to another border with Mozambique.

Demographics
At the time of the 2018 Census of Malawi, the distribution of the population of Thyolo District by ethnic group was as follows:
 77.2% Lomwe
 12.3% Mang'anja
 3.3% Ngoni
 2.1% Yao
 1.2% Sena
 1.1% Chewa
 0.3% Tumbuka
 0.2% Nyanja
 0.1% Tonga
 0.1% Nkhonde
 0.0% Lambya
 0.0% Sukwa
 2.1% Others

Government and administrative divisions

There are seven National Assembly constituencies in Thyolo:

 Thyolo - Central
 Thyolo - East
 Thyolo - North
B.
 Thyolo - South
 Thyolo - South West
 Thyolo - Thava
 Thyolo - West

Since the 2009 election all of these constituencies have been held by members of the Democratic Progressive Party.

Thyolo is one of the southernmost districts of Malawi, and is bordered by 5 others as well as Mozambique.

References

Districts of Malawi
Districts in Southern Region, Malawi